Dimapur Airport  is a domestic airport serving Chümoukedima–Dimapur and its neighbouring areas. It is located between the districts of Chümoukedima and Dimapur, from where National Highway 29 (formerly NH-39) passes just beside the airport. It is the only airport in the state of Nagaland. The terminal building can handle 500 departing and 300 arriving passengers, and was built during World War II. There are plans for expansion of the airport to meet international norms by acquiring land at Aoyimti Village.

Airlines and destinations

Statistics

Accidents and incidents
 On 16 August 1991, Indian Airlines Flight 257 operating on the Calcutta–Imphal–Dimapur route crashed on approach to Imphal Airport, killing all 69 people on board. Of the 63 passengers on board, 31 were booked for Dimapur Airport.

References

External links
 

Airports in Nagaland
Chümoukedima district
Chümoukedima
Dimapur
Airports with year of establishment missing
Transport in Chümoukedima
Transport in Dimapur